This is a list of events and openings related to amusement parks that occurred in 2018. These various lists are not exhaustive.

Amusement parks

Opening

China Three Gorges Happy World – January 19
Mexico Kataplum – November 1
U.S. Adventure Zone at Bear Lake – June 16
U.S. America's Fun Park – May 18
China Huayi Brothers Movie World
Russia Dreamwood
China Nanjing Wanda Theme Park – June 1
Poland Holiday Park Kownaty – September 29
France Parc Spirou – June 1
UAE Warner Bros. World Abu Dhabi – July 25
Malaysia Skytropolis Funland – December 7
Indonesia Saloka Park – December 15
Philippines Aqua Planet – February 24

Change of name
 U.S. Waterworld California » Six Flags Hurricane Harbor Concord
 UAE Sega Republic » VR Park Dubai

Change of ownership
 Darien Lake – Premier Parks » Six Flags
 Frontier City – Premier Parks » Six Flags
 White Water Bay (Oklahoma) – Premier Parks » Six Flags
 Wet'n'Wild SplashTown – Premier Parks » Six Flags
 Wet'n'Wild Phoenix – Premier Parks» Six Flags

Birthday

Adventuredome – 25th Birthday
Alabama Splash Adventure – 20th Birthday
Belantis – 15th Birthday
Carowinds – 45th Birthday
Disney's Animal Kingdom – 20th Birthday
Dutch Wonderland – 55th Birthday
Frontier City – 60th Birthday
Attractiepark Slagharen – 55th Birthday
Heide Park Resort – 40th Birthday
Movieland Park – 15th Birthday
SeaWorld Orlando – 45th Birthday
SeaWorld San Antonio – 30th Birthday
Silverwood Theme Park – 30th Birthday
Tokyo Disneyland – 35th Birthday
Worlds of Fun – 45th Birthday

Closed
 Ratanga Junction – May 1
 Bowcraft Playland – September 30
 Giant Wheel Park of Suzhou – September 10
 Heritage Amusement Park – June 30
 Southern Adventures

Additions

Roller coasters

New

Relocated

Refurbished

Other attractions

New

Refurbished

Closed attractions & roller coasters

 * This ride's closure was announced after the 2018 season

References

Amusement parks by year
Amusement parks